Arthur Hiller Penn  (September 27, 1922 – September 28, 2010) was an American director and producer of film, television and theater. Closely associated with the American New Wave,  Penn directed critically acclaimed films throughout the 1960s such as the drama The Chase (1966), the biographical crime film Bonnie and Clyde (1967) and the comedy Alice's Restaurant (1969). He also received attention for his acclaimed revisionist Western Little Big Man (1970). Night Moves (1975) and The Missouri Breaks (1976) which were commercial flops, though the first generated positive reviews.

In the 1990s he returned to stage and television direction and production, including an executive producer role for the crime series Law & Order. By his death in 2010, he had been nominated for three Academy Awards for Best Director, a BAFTA, a Golden Globe, two Emmys, and two Directors Guild of America Awards. He was the recipient of several honorary accolades, including an Honorary Golden Bear, a Tony Award, and an Akira Kurosawa Award from the San Francisco International Film Festival.

Early years
Penn was born to a Russian Jewish family in Philadelphia, Pennsylvania, the son of Sonia (Greenberg), a nurse, and Harry William Penn, originally Chaim Michelsohn, a watchmaker, both natives of then Novoaleksandrovsk, Russia now Zarasai, Lithuania. He was the younger brother of Irving Penn, the successful fashion photographer. During his early years, he moved in with his mother after she divorced his father. Some time after, he came back to his sickly father, leading him to run his father's watch repair shop. At 19, he was drafted into the United States Army during World War II (1943–1946), serving as an infantryman in the Battle of the Bulge. While stationed in Britain, he became interested in theater. He started to direct and take part in shows being put on for the soldiers around England at the time. As Penn grew up, he became increasingly interested in film, especially after seeing the Orson Welles film Citizen Kane. He later attended Black Mountain College in North Carolina, and was a featured commentator in the documentary Fully Awake about the college.

Career
After making a name for himself as a director of quality television dramas, Penn made his feature debut with The Left Handed Gun (1958) for Warner Brothers. A retelling of the Billy the Kid legend, it was distinguished by Paul Newman's portrayal of the outlaw as a psychologically troubled youth (the role was originally intended for James Dean). The production was completed in only 23 days, but Warner Brothers reedited the film against his wishes with a new ending he disapproved of. The film failed upon release in North America, but was well received in Europe.

Penn's second film was The Miracle Worker (1962), the story of Anne Sullivan's struggle to teach the blind and deaf Helen Keller how to communicate. It garnered two Academy Awards for its leads Anne Bancroft and Patty Duke. Penn had won a Tony Award for directing the stage production, written by William Gibson, also starring Bancroft and Duke, and he had directed Bancroft's Broadway debut in playwright Gibson's first Broadway production, Two for the Seesaw.

Penn began working on  The Train in France in June and August 1963 when star Burt Lancaster had Penn fired after three days of Penn's filming and called on John Frankenheimer to take over the film.

In 1965 Penn directed Mickey One. Heavily influenced by the French New Wave, it was the dreamlike story of a standup comedian (played by Warren Beatty) on the run from sinister, ambiguous forces. In 2010, Penn commented: "You know, you could not have gone through the Second World War with all that nonsense with Russia being an ally and then being the big black monster. It was an absurd time. The McCarthy period was ridiculous and humiliating, deeply humiliating. When I finally did 'Mickey One', it was in repudiation of the kind of fear that overtook free people to the point where they were telling on each other and afraid to speak out. It just astonished me, really astonished me. I mean, I was a vet, so it was nothing like what we thought we were fighting for."

Penn's next film was The Chase (1966) a thriller following events in a small corrupt Southern town on the day an escaped convict, played by Robert Redford, returns. Although not a major success, The Chase nonetheless caught the mood of the turbulent times, a 'state of the nation' tale of racism, corruption and the violence endemic in American society. Also that year, he directed the stage version of the thriller Wait Until Dark starring Lee Remick and Robert Duvall.

He reunited with Warren Beatty for the gangster film Bonnie and Clyde (1967). The film went on to become a worldwide phenomenon. It was strongly influenced by the French New Wave and itself went on to make a huge impression on a younger generation of filmmakers. Indeed, there was a strong resurgence in the "love on the run" subgenre in the wake of Bonnie and Clyde, peaking with Badlands (1973; in which Penn received acknowledgement in the credits). Beatty had given him 10% of the potential profits of the film before production started and the success of the film earned Penn over $2 million.

At the time he had completed Bonnie and Clyde, Penn was residing in Stockbridge, Massachusetts, when he heard a story of a large-scale littering incident that had happened in the town two years prior. He contacted Arlo Guthrie, received permission to adapt his song "Alice's Restaurant Massacree" into a film, and secured Guthrie's participation as well as several other Stockbridge town residents while filming in many of the same locations where the events took place. The film Alice's Restaurant was released in 1969. His next film was Little Big Man (1970), a "shaggy dog" account of the life of a white man (played by Dustin Hoffman) who gets adopted into the Cheyenne tribe.

In 1973 Penn provided a segment for a promotional film for the Olympics titled Visions of Eight along with several other major directors such as John Schlesinger and Miloš Forman. His next film was Night Moves (1975) about a private detective (played by Gene Hackman) on the trail of a runaway. Next came The Missouri Breaks (1976), a ramshackle, eccentric story of a horse thief (Jack Nicholson) facing off with an eccentric bounty hunter (played by Marlon Brando).

In the 1980s, Penn's career began to lose its momentum with critics and audiences. Four Friends (1981) was a traumatic look back at the 1960s.  Target (1985) was a mainstream thriller reuniting the director with Gene Hackman, and  Dead of Winter (1987) was a horror/thriller. Subsequently, Penn returned to work in television, including as an executive producer for the crime series Law & Order.

Penn maintained an affiliation with Yale University, occasionally teaching classes there.

Personal life
In 1955, he married actress Peggy Maurer. They had two children: son Matthew Penn and daughter, Molly Penn.

In July 2010, Penn reflected on his life and career, including his relationship with Alger Hiss:

Death
Penn died in Manhattan, on September 28, 2010, a day after his 88th birthday from congestive heart failure.

Work 
{| style="width:100%;"
|- style="vertical-align:top;"
| width="50%" |

Filmography

Stage

Television

References

External links
 
 
 
 Arthur Penn at Senses of Cinema
 Looking Back at Arthur Penn – slideshow by The New York Times
 Literature on Arthur Penn

1922 births
2010 deaths
20th-century American businesspeople
American film directors
American people of Russian-Jewish descent
Bard College faculty
Broadway theatre directors
Film producers from New York (state)
Film producers from Pennsylvania
Honorary Golden Bear recipients
Jewish theatre directors
Military personnel from Pennsylvania
Military personnel from Philadelphia
Television producers from New York City
Television producers from Pennsylvania
Tony Award winners
United States Army personnel of World War II
United States Army soldiers